Brian Mann (born May 7, 1980) is the head athletic director at the College of William & Mary in Williamsburg, Virginia. Mann was formerly the Senior Associate Athletic Director and Chief Development Officer at the University of California.

He is a former American football quarterback for the Los Angeles Avengers in the Arena Football League. Mann holds the Dartmouth College football single-season record for passing yards with 2,913.  He was previously the associate athletic director for development at Rice University in Houston, Texas.

Playing career

High school
Brian Mann attended Xaverian Brothers High School in Westwood, Massachusetts, and was a student and a three-sport captain in football, basketball, and baseball. In football, his team won two consecutive state titles.

College
Mann attended Dartmouth College and was a four-year letterman in football. As a senior, he passed for a school single-season record 2,913 yards, was the team MVP, and was an All-Ivy League selection.

While at Dartmouth he was a member of the football fraternity Gamma Delta Chi.

Movie career
Through his career, Brian has landed roles as a body double for quarterback roles such as Adam Sandler's double in the remake of The Longest Yard and the role as the quarterback in Invincible.

Personal life 
Mann is currently married to Hilary Wellinghoff, of Houston, TX.

External links
Dartmouth bio
AFL stats

1980 births
Living people
American football quarterbacks
Dartmouth Big Green football players
Los Angeles Avengers players
People from Westwood, Massachusetts
William & Mary Tribe athletic directors
Xaverian Brothers High School alumni